Lophoziopsis is a genus of liverworts belonging to the family Lophoziaceae.

The genus has almost cosmopolitan distribution.

Species:
 Lophoziopsis excisa (Dicks.) Konstant. & Vilnet 
 Lophoziopsis longidens (Lindb.) Konstant. & Vilnet

References

Jungermanniales
Jungermanniales genera